The 2008 Oceania Women's Sevens Championship was the inaugural tournament for the Oceania Women's Sevens Championship and was held in Samoa from 25–26 July. The tournament was a regional qualifier for the 2009 Rugby World Cup Sevens. Australia won the tournament and  New Zealand were runners-up. They made history by qualifying for the first ever Rugby World Cup Sevens women's competition.

Teams 
Five teams competed at the tournament and were vying for a spot at the RWC Sevens.

Tournament

Finals

References 

2008
2008 rugby sevens competitions
2008 in women's rugby union